Broker injection attack is a type of vulnerability that exploits misconfigured brokers, potentially allowing an attacker to read, write and inject information from/into their flow.

Description 
There are many scenarios in which a broker is used to transport the information between tasks.

One of the most typical use cases is send e-mails in background. In this scenario we'll have two actors:

 An information producer (a website, for example).
 A worker or background process who actually sends the e-mail.

The producer needs an asynchronous and non-blocking way to send the email information to the worker.

This system is usually a broker. It takes the information from the web front-end and passes it to the worker, generating a new task in the worker. So, the worker has all the information to send the e-mail.

Taking the above scenario as an example, if we could access the broker, we would be able to make the worker generate new tasks with arbitrary data, unleashing a broker injection.

Attacks 
With this in mind, we could make the following attacks:

 Listing remote tasks.
 Reading a remote task's contents.
 Injection of tasks into remote processes.
 Removing remote outstanding tasks.

Origin 
The broker injection attack is not new, but it didn't have a name. This name was coined by Daniel García (cr0hn) at the RootedCON 2016 conference in Spain.

See also 
 Redis
 RabbitMQ
 ZeroMQ
 Message broker
 Celery (software)

External links 
 Official Redis security tips
 Enteletaor: The broker injection tool
 Broker injection in RootedCON 2016 (Spanish)

Hacking (computer security)
Machine code
Injection exploits
Computer network security